John William Hickey (November 3, 1881 – December 28, 1941) was a Major League Baseball pitcher who played for one season. He pitched two games for the Cleveland Naps during the 1904 season, starting both.

External links

1881 births
1941 deaths
Cleveland Naps players
Major League Baseball pitchers
Baseball players from Minnesota
Seattle Clamdiggers players
Grand Rapids Furniture Makers players
Minneapolis Millers (baseball) players
St. Paul Saints (Western League) players
Seattle Siwashes players
Seattle Chinooks players
Columbus Senators players
Milwaukee Brewers (minor league) players
Indianapolis Indians players
Spokane Indians players
Vancouver Beavers players